Pécs-Pogány Airport or Pécs South Airport  is a small commercial airport serving Pécs, a city in Baranya County in Hungary.  Several aviation database sources incorrectly cite the IATA code for Pécs-Pogány as QPJ, however the IATA website lists it as PEV.

Airlines and destinations
As of April 2015, there are no scheduled services to and from Pécs.

Statistics

References

External links
 Official website
 
 

Airports in Hungary
Buildings and structures in Baranya County